The United Nations Mission in East Timor (UNAMET) was established by Security Council Resolution 1246 on 11 June 1999 for a period up to 31 August 1999. By Security Council Resolution 1257 of 3 August UNAMET was extended to 30 September 1999.

Mandate

To organise and conduct a popular consultation on the basis of a direct, secret and universal ballot, to ascertain whether the East Timorese people accept the proposed constitutional framework providing for a special autonomy for East Timor within the unitary Republic of Indonesia or reject the proposed special autonomy for East Timor, leading to East Timor's separation from Indonesia, in accordance with the General Agreement and to enable the Secretary-General to discharge his responsibility under paragraph 3 of the Security Agreement.

Staff
 Personal Representative of the Secretary-General: Ambassador Jamsheed Marker (Pakistan)
 Special Representative of the Secretary-General and Head of Mission: Mr Ian Martin (United Kingdom)
 Deputy Personal Representative of the Secretary-General: Mr Francesc Vendrell (Spain)
 Chief of Civilian Police: Commissioner Alan Mills (Australia)
 Chief Military Liaison Officer: Brigadier General Rezaqul Haider (Bangladesh)
 Electoral Commissioners: Patrick A. Bradley (Ireland), Johann Kriegler (South Africa) and Bong-Scuk Sohn (South Korea)
 Chief Electoral Officer: Mr Jeff Fischer (United States)
 Chief Administrative Officer: Mr Johanes Wortel (The Netherlands)
 Chief Political Officer: Ms Beng Yong Chew (Singapore)
 Chief of Public Information: Mr David Wimhurst (Canada)

International Staff: current deployment = 210 (full deployment = 242)

Civilian Police: current deployment = 271 (fully deployed)

Contributions from Argentina, Australia, Austria, Bangladesh, Brazil, Canada, Egypt, Ghana, Ireland, Italy, Japan, Jordan, Malaysia, Mozambique, Nepal, New Zealand, Pakistan, Philippines, Portugal, Republic of Korea, Russian Federation, Senegal, Spain, Sweden, Thailand, United Kingdom, Uruguay, US, Zimbabwe

Military Liaison Officers: current deployment = 50 (fully deployed)

Contributions from Australia, Austria, Bangladesh, Brazil, Denmark, Ireland, Malaysia, New Zealand, Portugal, Russian Federation, Thailand, United Kingdom, US, Uruguay

UN Volunteers: current deployment = 422 (full deployment = 425) (includes district electoral officers, support staff and medical unit) Contributions from 67 countries

Local Staff: current figure = 668 core staff (401 hired for 20 days voter registration period and an additional 3,600 will be hired for a five-day period before and after the ballot – 5 local staff at each polling station)

In popular culture
UNAMET is depicted in the ABC television series, Answered By Fire (2006).
Hazel, Geoff (2020). Picture a Dry Riverbed. Historical autobiography of the civilian police in the District of Ermera, East Timor as they assisted in the conduct of the Popular Consultation.
Pemper, Tammy (2019). Scorched Earth. Big Sky Publishing. A biography from a peacekeeper's perspective, based on actual events in Timor during the historical 1999 referendum.

Further reading

References

Mission 1999
1999 in East Timor
Indonesian occupation of East Timor
Sovereignty referendums
1990s establishments in East Timor
1990s disestablishments in East Timor
1999 establishments in Indonesia
1999 establishments in Southeast Asia
1999 disestablishments in Southeast Asia